, officially Sacred Island of Okinoshima and Associated Sites in the Munakata Region, is a group of sites in northwest Kyūshū, Japan, that was inscribed on the UNESCO World Heritage List in 2017, under criteria ii and iii.

Background
The three Munakata kami are said in the Kojiki and Nihon Shoki to be daughters of Amaterasu, spawned upon the sun-goddess' consumption of giant swords. Okitsu-Miya on the island of Okinoshima is part of the Shinto shrine complex of Munakata Taisha; no formal shrine buildings were constructed on the island; instead rock piles or yorishiro provided the focus for veneration. Over 80,000 artefacts were ritually deposited at the site from the fourth to the tenth centuries. These have been designated a National Treasure. They include mirrors and bronze dragon-head finials from Wei China; gold rings and horse-trappings similar to those found in Silla tombs in Korea; and fragments of a glass bowl from Sassanian Persia. The , powerful local rulers, controlled the route to the continent and "presided over the rituals". The many kofun or tumuli in the area are believed to be their burial ground.

Component Sites

Original submission
The following sites were included in the original nomination, but were excluded from the final inscription:

See also

 List of National Treasures of Japan (archaeological materials)
 Yorishiro
 World Heritage Sites in Japan

References

External links
 Okinoshima Island and Related Sites in Munakata Region
 Proposal document
 Pamphlet

History of Fukuoka Prefecture
Japanese culture
World Heritage Sites in Japan